Marigolds in August is a 1980 South African drama film directed by Ross Devenish, based on the play of the same name by Athol Fugard. It was entered into the 30th Berlin International Film Festival, where it won the Berlin Bear Anniversary Prize.

Cast
 Athol Fugard as Paulus Olifant
 Winston Ntshona as Daan
 John Kani as Melton
 Joyce Hesha as Melton's Wife
 Nomonde Mhlobiso as Alice
 Mabel Ntshinga as Emily

References

External links

1980 films
1980 drama films
English-language South African films
Apartheid films
Films directed by Ross Devenish
South African drama films
1980s English-language films